Nicholas Griffin Petrecki (born July 11, 1989 in Clifton Park, New York) is an American former professional ice hockey defenseman who played one game with the San Jose Sharks in the National Hockey League (NHL) during the 2012–13 season.

Playing career
Petrecki played two seasons with the Omaha Lancers of the USHL before being selected 28th overall by the San Jose Sharks in the 2007 NHL Entry Draft. Previous to his seasons with the lancers he played with the CD Selects of the EJHL. Petrecki also played youth hockey for Clifton Park Youth Hockey Association (Eagles) and Troy Albany Youth Hockey Association.

He played NCAA Hockey with the Boston College Eagles, who won the NCAA Men's Ice Hockey Championship title in his first season with the team (2007–2008). During his time at BC he became well known for his strong defense as well as his heavy hits. He was known as the enforcer for BC's team, leading the Eagles in penalty minutes from 2007–2009. He also notably received a game misconduct for headbutting a University of Maine player in a game at Conte Forum. Additionally, he chipped in on offense, scoring two goals including the overtime game winner in BC's 2008 Beanpot Championship Game victory over Harvard, and scoring a goal to help push BC to a comeback victory over the Miami RedHawks in the 2008 NCAA Tournament.

On March 30, 2009 Petrecki signed an NHL contract with the San Jose Sharks and was assigned to the Worcester Sharks (AHL).

During the 2013–14 season, his fifth with the Worcester Sharks, Petrecki was reassigned on loan by San Jose to fellow AHL club, the Rochester Americans on March 12, 2014.

On August 19, 2014, he opted to continue his career with the Amerks in signing as a free agent to a one-year AHL contract.

Career statistics

References

External links

1989 births
Living people
American men's ice hockey defensemen
Boston College Eagles men's ice hockey players
Chicago Wolves players
Elmira Jackals (ECHL) players
Hartford Wolf Pack players
Ice hockey players from New York (state)
Indy Fuel players
National Hockey League first-round draft picks
Omaha Lancers players
Rochester Americans players
Sportspeople from Schenectady, New York
San Jose Sharks draft picks
San Jose Sharks players
Worcester Sharks players